Concepción is a town in the lowlands of eastern Bolivia. It is known as part of the Jesuit Missions of Chiquitos, declared in 1990 a World Heritage Site, as a former Jesuit Reduction.

Location
Concepción is the capital of Ñuflo de Chávez Province in the Santa Cruz Department and is located at an elevation of 500 m above sea level, circa 250 kilometers northeast of Santa Cruz de la Sierra, the department's capital.

History
Concepción was founded in 1699 by Jesuits Francisco Lucas Caballero and Francisco Hervás. It served as a mission for the Christianization of the Chiquitano and Guaraní peoples. In 1722 the village moved to its present place, and in 1745 it was inhabited by circa 2,000 people of the Punasicas, Boococas, Tubasicas, Paicones, Puyzocas, Quimonecas, Quitemos, Napecas, Paunacas and Tapacuracas tribes.

Between 1753 and 1756 the cathedral of Concepción was built (see photo), which still is the center of the blooming town. In 1766, Concepción was inhabited by 713 families and 3,276 persons. When in 1767 Charles III expelled the Jesuits and the village was administered by secular authorities, many of its inhabitants fled to the woods.

During the decade that followed the population decreased drastically, caused by epidemics, famine, the mismanagement of the new clergy and - at the end of the 19th century - by deporting the indigenous population to the rubber plantations.

Languages
Camba Spanish is the most commonly used everyday language. The Bésɨro dialect of Chiquitano is also spoken in the town.

Infrastructure
Concepción has a gravel airfield of 1,900 m length (Airport-Code CEP).

Population
The town's population has increased strongly in the past decades:
1969: 1,100 inhabitants
1992: 3,228 inhabitants (census)
2001: 5,586 inhabitants (census)
2008: 8,221 inhabitants (est.)

Climate

The climate in the Concepción area is typical of the Bolivian lowlands east of the Andes, and weather data from Concepción is used to illustrate the weather and climate of the region.

Famous inhabitants
Hugo Banzer Suárez (1926–2002), Bolivian president 1971-1978 and 1997–2002

See also
 Immaculate Conception Cathedral, Concepción
 List of Jesuit sites
 List of the Jesuit Missions of Chiquitos

References

External links

Detailed map of province
History of Concepción
Concepción at Boliviabella
 Description of Jesuit mission (World Heritage Site) with pictures and information

Populated places in Santa Cruz Department (Bolivia)
Populated places established in 1699
1699 establishments in the Spanish Empire
Jesuit Missions of Chiquitos